Glangleu is a village in the far west of Ivory Coast. It is in the sub-prefecture of Zouan-Hounien, Zouan-Hounien Department, Tonkpi Region, Montagnes District. The village is seven kilometres east of the border with Liberia.

Glangleu was a commune until March 2012, when it became one of 1126 communes nationwide that were abolished.

Notes

Former communes of Ivory Coast
Populated places in Montagnes District
Populated places in Tonkpi